Aloe hereroensis is an African Aloe native to Angola, Namibia and South Africa. Like other Aloe species, it forms a rosette of succulent, lanceolate, greyish-green leaves with teeth along their edges. These leaves can grow up to 40 cm long. A. hereroensis forms large inflorescences, up to 1 meter high, with clusters of scarlet flowers.

References

External links

 

hereroensis
Flora of Angola
Flora of Southern Africa